Julia K. Steinberger (born 1974) is Professor of Ecological Economics at the University of Lausanne. She studies the relationships between the use of resources and performance of societies. She is an author of the Intergovernmental Panel on Climate Change (IPCC) 6th Assessment Report, contributing to the report's discussion of climate change mitigation pathways.

Education and early life 
Steinberger, daughter of Nobel laureate in Physics Jack Steinberger, studied science at the Collège de Saussure in Switzerland, where she was awarded the de Saussure prize in 1993. Steinberger moved to the United States for her graduate degree, working at Brown University on the cosmic microwave background. She earned her PhD studying ultracold atoms at the Massachusetts Institute of Technology. She worked in the Centre for ultracold atoms with Thomas Greytak and Daniel Kleppner, developing new ways to trap ultracold hydrogen and deuterium. The comparison of hyperfine splitting in the ground and excited state is expected to test quantum electrodynamics. During graduate school Steinberger was a member of the MIT Social Justice Cooperative.

Research and career 
Steinberger was a postdoctoral fellow at the University of Lausanne and then the University of Zurich, working alongside Claudia Binder. Steinberger was appointed Senior Researcher at the University of Klagenfurt Institute of Social Ecology in 2007. Her research considers the relationships between the use of resources (energy, materials and emission of greenhouse gases) and performance of societies (wellbeing and economic output). She is interested in identifying new development pathways toward a low carbon society. She joined the University of Leeds as an associate professor in ecological economics in 2011. She is a member of the Centre for Climate Change Economics and Policy (CCCEP). On 1 August 2020, Steinberger joined the University of Lausanne as a full professor on the social impact of climate change.

Steinberger showed the greenhouse gas emissions of global cities depends on the relation between geophysical and technical factors. She has also investigated the textile chain, food waste and materials use. Steinberger is a member of the Engineering and Physical Sciences Research Council (EPSRC) iBUILD (Infrastructure BUsiness models, valuation and Innovation for Local Delivery) iBUILD.

Steinberger is the Principal Investigator on the Leverhulme Trust Project "Living Well Within Limits". The project investigates what the biophysical requirements are for human well-being, and the influence of social provisioning on the levels of resource associated with this. The project also looks to understand how the world's limited resources could be used to preserve human wellbeing. To achieve this, Steinberger believes it is necessary to define what a "good" life is, understand what the requirements are for wellbeing and the context surrounding international inequality.

Steinberger has studied how humanity can maintain a good quality of life without damaging the planet. She argues that to achieve the United Nations (UN) Sustainable Development Goals the world must move away from growth and toward an economic model that promotes sustainability and equity. Steinberger and colleagues visualised the relationship between national performance in several environmental sustainability indicators and social thresholds for a 'good life'.

In 2020, Harrabin reported on her research on the responsibility of the rich for climate change. 

Steinberger supports the work of Greta Thunberg and the school strike for climate activists. She was one of 238 academics who called for the European Union to limit economic growth and instead promote stability and wellbeing. Steinberger has been the Lead Author on the Intergovernmental Panel on Climate Change 6th Assessment Report for Working Group 3. She was also Lead Author on the Urbanisation knowledge module of the International Institute for Applied Systems Analysis (IIASA) Global Energy Assessment. She is on the Steering Committee of Future Earth.

In October 2022, Steinberger participated at a road blockage in Bern with the Swiss ecological movement Renovate Switzerland, and glued her hand to the pavement alongside five other people.

Personal life
Steinberger is the daughter of Jack Steinberger and Cynthia Steinberger. She is the half-sister of musical instrument and industrial designer Ned Steinberger.

References

External links 

 Julia Steinberger's profile at School of Earth and Environment, University of Leeds
 Julia K. Steinberger's profile at Google Scholar
 Julia K. Steinberger's profile at Twitter
 Living Well Within Limits

1974 births
Living people
Swiss women academics
Swiss women scientists
Swiss women physicists
Climate change and society
Academics of the University of Leeds
Academic staff of the University of Lausanne
Brown University alumni
Massachusetts Institute of Technology alumni
Swiss people of German-Jewish descent